Bill Berthusen is a former professional American football player who played defensive lineman for the New York Giants and Cincinnati Bengals.

References

1959 births
American football defensive linemen
New York Giants players
Cincinnati Bengals players
Iowa State Cyclones football players
Living people
People from Grinnell, Iowa
National Football League replacement players